The pointy-nosed blue chimaera (Hydrolagus trolli), also known as the pointy-nosed blue ratfish, Ray Troll's chimaera or abyssal ghostshark, is a species of deep-sea fish in the family Chimaeridae.

Etymology
The specific name trolli honors Ray Troll, an American artist who has featured chimaeras in his art.

Distribution and habitat
This species is found in the Pacific and Southern Oceans, with records from near New Caledonia, New Zealand, and southern Australia; records from South Africa refer to other species.

Specimens provisionally assigned to this species have also seen in waters near California and Hawaii, alive, in 2009. As with many other deep-sea species, its distribution likely covers much of the globe, but is poorly known. However, this species of Chimaeridae was the first to have been captured on film, leading to further insight on it.

Description
The body has distinctive blue-gray coloration. A dark line is seen around the orbit, as well as dark shadowing along edges of lateral line canals. The snout is pointed. It grows to  total length. It also has a venomous spine in front of its dorsal fin, which is used in defense.

The species is oviparous.

Fisheries
The species has no commercial value, but it occurs as bycatch in fisheries with deep-water benthic trawls. It might also be bycatch in (illegal) Patagonian toothfish fisheries. However, most of the habitat of this species is deeper than where deep-water fisheries typically operate.

Conservation status 
In June 2018 the New Zealand Department of Conservation classified the pointy-nosed blue chimaera as "Not Threatened" with the qualifier "Secure Overseas" under the New Zealand Threat Classification System.

References

pointy-nosed blue chimaera
Fish of New Caledonia
Marine fish of New Zealand
pointy-nosed blue chimaera
Taxonomy articles created by Polbot